The Europe/Africa Zone was one of the three zones of the regional Davis Cup competition in 1991.

In the Europe/Africa Zone there were two different tiers, called groups, in which teams competed against each other to advance to the upper tier. The winner in the Africa Zone Group II advanced to the Europe/Africa Zone Group I in 1992.

Participating nations

Draw

  promoted to Group I in 1992.

First round

Zambia vs. Cameroon

Kenya vs. Congo

Algeria vs. Ivory Coast

Egypt vs. Senegal

Second round

Zambia vs. Nigeria

Zimbabwe vs. Kenya

Ivory Coast vs. Togo

Egypt vs. Ghana

Third round

Kenya vs. Nigeria

Ivory Coast vs. Egypt

Fourth round

Kenya vs. Ivory Coast

References

External links
Davis Cup official website

Davis Cup Europe/Africa Zone
Africa Zone Group II